Shawqi Shafiq (born 1955 in Aden) is a Yemeni poet and translator. The author's work has been published in Banipal magazine. The author of 8 books of poetry, some of his works have been published in several languages.

References

1955 births
Living people
Yemeni poets
People from Aden
Yemeni translators
20th-century Yemeni writers
21st-century Yemeni writers
Date of birth missing (living people)